Stoughton is a city in Dane County, Wisconsin, United States. It straddles the Yahara River about 20 miles southeast of the state capital, Madison. Stoughton is part of the Madison Metropolitan Statistical Area. As of the 2020 census, the population was 13,173.

Known for its Norwegian heritage, Stoughton hosts a citywide celebration of Syttende Mai, the Norwegian constitution day. Part of the city's celebration of its Norwegian heritage is the Stoughton Norwegian Dancers dance group, sponsored by Stoughton High School, as well as Norwegian flags and memorabilia displayed throughout the town.

History
Stoughton was founded in 1847 by Luke Stoughton, an Englishman from Vermont. Many Norwegian immigrants settled in the town from 1865 through the early 1900s.

Stoughton claims to be the birthplace of the "coffee break", and hosts a small yearly parade to celebrate the distinction.

For much of its history, Stoughton has been Dane County's second-largest and economically important city, after Madison.

In 1919, the Stoughton Wagon Company began putting custom wagon bodies on Model T chassis; by 1929 Ford was by far the biggest seller of station wagons.

On August 18, 2005, an F3 tornado cut a 10-mile path across rural subdivisions and farms north of Stoughton, killing one person and damaging hundreds of homes.

Geography

Demographics

2020 census 
As of the census of 2020 there were 13,173 people, 5,262 households, and 3,296 families residing in the city. The racial makeup of the city was 96.6% White, 0.9% African American, 0.1% Native American, 0.0% Asian, and 1.7% from two or more races. Hispanic or Latino people of any race were 1.9% of the population.

The age and gender makeup of the city was 6.8% under the age of 5, 26.5% under 18, 17.5% over the age of 65 and 52.0% female. Of the total population, 601 were veterans.

2010 census
As of the census of 2010, there were 12,611 people, 5,133 households, and 3,296 families residing in the city. The racial makeup of the city was 95.1% White, 1.4% African American, 0.2% Native American, 1.3% Asian, 0.4% from other races, and 1.5% from two or more races. Hispanic or Latino people of any race were 1.8% of the population.

There were 5,133 households, of which 33.6% had children under the age of 18 living with them, 49.3% were married couples living together, 10.7% had a female householder with no husband present, 4.2% had a male householder with no wife present, and 35.8% were non-families. 29.4% of all households were made up of individuals, and 12.4% had someone living alone who was 65 years of age or older. The average household size was 2.41 and the average family size was 2.99.

The median age in the city was 39.2 years. 25.1% of residents were under the age of 18; 6.5% were between the ages of 18 and 24; 27.6% were from 25 to 44; 26.2% were from 45 to 64; and 14.6% were 65 years of age or older. The gender makeup of the city was 47.2% male and 52.8% female.

2000 census
As of the census of 2000, there were 12,354 people, 4,734 households, and 3,185 families residing in the city. The population density was 3,116.6 people per square mile (1,204.5/km2). There were 4,890 housing units at an average density of 1,233.6 per square mile (476.8/km2). The racial makeup of the city was 96.66% White, 0.92% African American, 0.29% Native American, 0.70% Asian, 0.02% Pacific Islander, 0.36% from other races, and 1.05% from two or more races. Hispanic or Latino people of any race were 1.24% of the population. 32.0% were of German, 28.9% Norwegian, 8.5% Irish and 5.3% English ancestry.

There were 4,734 households, out of which 37.5% had children under the age of 18 living with them, 53.6% were married couples living together, 10.1% had a female householder with no husband present, and 32.7% were non-families. 26.2% of all households were made up of individuals, and 11.6% had someone living alone who was 65 years of age or older. The average household size was 2.52 and the average family size was 3.06.

In the city, the population was spread out, with 28.3% under the age of 18, 6.4% from 18 to 24, 32.6% from 25 to 44, 18.4% from 45 to 64, and 14.3% who were 65 years of age or older. The median age was 35 years. For every 100 females, there were 89.4 males. For every 100 females age 18 and over, there were 86.3 males.

The median income for a household in the city was $47,633, and the median income for a family was $58,543. Males had a median income of $37,956 versus $26,187 for females. The per capita income for the city was $21,037. About 3.1% of families and 5.0% of the population were below the poverty line, including 5.9% of those under age 18 and 7.2% of those age 65 or over.

Government
Stoughton is incorporated as a city, with an elected mayor and a 12-member city council. Aldermen from four districts are elected to three-year terms, with the terms staggered so one seat is up for election in each district each spring.

The Stoughton Area School District serves the city, and is overseen by an elected board of education.

Economy
The corporate headquarters and semi-trailer manufacturing facility for Stoughton Trailers are located in Stoughton, where the company has been locally owned and operated for more than 50 years. The 680,000 sq. ft. Stoughton plant houses everything from fabrication of subassemblies to final assembly of all Stoughton dry vans. Stoughton Trailers is one of the largest truck trailer manufacturing companies in North America, and is the only American company still manufacturing 53-foot-long "intermodal" freight containers used to ship goods internationally.

Another large employer in the city is Uniroyal Engineered Products, makers of Naugahyde. Stoughton and its environs are also home to printers, and manufacturers of foodstuffs, chemicals, and sundry other products. North American Fur Auctions' US offices are based in Stoughton.

Stoughton Utilities, a municipally-owned utility, provides electrical, water and sewer service to the city.

Transportation 
US Highway 51 comes from Madison and goes along the west side of town, then turns east through downtown towards the Interstates. US Highway 14 has an exit for Stoughton at Wisconsin Highway 138 6 miles west of the city in the village of Oregon. WIS-138 heads west at US-14 from Oregon into Stoughton, then goes south towards the unincorporated Cooksville.

Commercial air service is provided by Dane County Regional Airport.

Education 
Stoughton is served by the Stoughton Area School District, which covers most of southeastern Dane County as well as a small portion of Rock County. SASD operates three elementary schools, one middle school, and one high school. There is no higher education in the city, but a UW science lab operates in rural Stoughton on Schneider Road.

Media
The weekly Stoughton Courier-Hub newspaper, founded in 1969, is published on Thursdays.

WSTO TV is a public, educational, and government access (PEG) cable TV channel operated by The City of Stoughton's Media Services Department.

The 495-seat Stoughton Opera House features about 30 traveling musical, comedy and other acts each year.

Events
The coffee break is said to have originated in Stoughton, when immigrant men became employed en masse at T. G. Mandt's wagon factory, leaving their wives to fill the shortages at the tobacco warehouses. They agreed to work under the condition that they were allowed to go home every morning and afternoon to tend to chores and, of course, drink coffee. The city of Stoughton celebrates the coffee break every summer with the Stoughton Coffee Break Festival.

The first weekend in December marks Stoughton's Victorian Holiday Weekend, celebrating the city's Victorian homes and commercial buildings. Events include a Victorian Holiday Ball with period dances, a production of the Nutcracker Ballet or A Christmas Carol (alternates each year), carriage rides, a silent decorated fire truck parade, a children's parade.

The weekend closest to May 17, Norwegian Constitution Day, marks Stoughton's Syttende Mai festival. The celebration includes parades, an art fair, Norwegian dance performances, races, and other events.  The Stoughton Chamber of Commerce has planned the festival every year since 1967.

In the media
In 2004, a Norwegian TV crew traveled to the Midwest to witness modern manifestations of Norsky culture in the US. They visited Stoughton, Mount Horeb and Decorah, Iowa. Their documentary Ja, de elsker (Yes, they love, a reference to the Norwegian national anthem) was aired on NRK1 on May 16 and 17, 2006.

Notable people

 Ole Amundsen Buslett, author
 John Edward Erickson, Governor of Montana, born in Stoughton
 Jerry Frei, head coach of the Oregon Ducks football team, NFL assistant coach
 Gale Gillingham, Green Bay Packer Hall of Fame
 Russell Hellickson, silver medalist in freestyle wrestling at the 1976 Summer Olympics
 Bob Homme, star of the Canadian television series The Friendly Giant
 Henry Huber, Lieutenant Governor of Wisconsin
 Justin Jacobs, 2014 PECASE winner, Orlando Magic statistician
 Ole C. Lee, Wisconsin State Representative
 Thomas A. Loftus, United States ambassador to Norway, Wisconsin politician
 Louis K. Luse, Wisconsin State Representative and lawyer
 Per Lysne, artist
 Alonzo J. Mathison, Wisconsin State Representative
 John McCarthy, Nebraska politician and member of the United States House of Representatives, born in Stoughton
 John E. McCoy, U.S. Air National Guard general
 Henry Everett McNeil, writer
 William P. Murphy, Nobel Prize laureate
 Truman O. Olson, Medal of Honor recipient
 Andrew Rein, silver medal in freestyle wrestling (lightweight class) at the 1984 Summer Olympics
 Ole K. Roe, Wisconsin State Representative
 Christopher J. Rollis, Wisconsin State Representative and newspaper editor
 Rudy Silbaugh, Wisconsin State Representative
 Carl W. Thompson, Wisconsin State Senator
 Charles D. Wells, Wisconsin State Representative
 Norman Wengert, political scientist
 Wayne W. Wood, Wisconsin State Representative
 Ralph Wise Zwicker, U.S. Army Major General

Images

References

External links

 City of Stoughton
 Stoughton Chamber of Commerce

Cities in Wisconsin
Norwegian-American culture in Wisconsin
Cities in Dane County, Wisconsin
Populated places established in 1847
1847 establishments in Wisconsin Territory